Johnny Henri Terwingen (born 21 June 1951 in Maasmechelen), better known as John Terra, is a Belgian singer and crooner mainly in Flemish. After many years of success, he started producing for other famous Belgian artists.

Discography

Albums

Singles

For positions indicated as Ultratip, the song did not appear in the official Belgian Ultratop 50 charts, but rather in the bubbling under Ultratip charts.

References

Belgian male singers
1951 births
Living people
People from Maasmechelen